The Northumberland Formation is a Late Cretaceous (?Campanian-?Maastrichtian)-aged geologic formation in Canada. It belongs to the larger Nanaimo Group. Indeterminate bird and pterosaur fossils have been recovered from the formation, as well as a potential gladius of Eromangateuthis. The Northumberland Formation has been known to science since at least 2008.

See also

 List of pterosaur-bearing stratigraphic units

Footnotes

References

Mesozoic Erathem of North America